Deshamanya Herman Leonard de Silva, PC (28 January 1928 – 7 April 2009)   was a Sri Lankan lawyer and diplomat.  He was the former Permanent Representative of Sri Lanka to the United Nations (New York). He was a former President and honorary life member of the Bar Association of Sri Lanka.

Education

De Silva was educated at St Peter's College, Colombo and Nalanda College Colombo. He subsequently entered the Faculty of Law at the University of Ceylon in 1948, graduated LLB in 1951, completed the Ceylon Law College examinations and qualified for the Bar in 1953.

Professional life

After a period of working alongside Felix Dias Bandaranaike in the unofficial bar, he joined the Attorney General Department in 1955 as  a Crown Counsel, a post he relinquished in 1970 to rejoin the unofficial Bar.

He was described as ""a master of the law, an eloquent speaker with the gift of presenting a case attractively, a good debater with a razor sharp intellect"" by Lakshman Kadirgamar and SL Gunasekera has classed him as one of the greats in Sri Lankan Law along with his close friend and contemporary in the Attorney General Department Elanga Wikramanayake.

He is best known for his work as an expert on Constitutional Law,  being a member Government’s peace delegation at peace talks.

Honours

De Silva was appointed a Senior Attorney  (now referred to as Presidents Counsel after the 1978 Constitutional reform) by the President, admitted to the Roll of Honour of St. Peter’s College in 1984 and awarded the title ‘Vishva Prasadini (Nithiya)’ by the Government of Sri Lanka in 1997 in recognition of contributions to the advancement of the law and subsequently the title Deshamanya. The 2009 Bar Association Law Journal was dedicated to HL De Silva and the Bar Association awarded the Deshamanya H. L. De Silva Memorial award to the winner of a legal essay competition open to junior lawyers.

See also 
Sri Lankan Non Career Diplomats
Heads of missions from Sri Lanka

References

External links
 The Island 
 rediff.com 
 www.slmission.com 
 The Nation 

 National Awards Conferred by His Excellency the President of Sri Lanka

Sinhalese lawyers
Ceylonese advocates
President's Counsels (Sri Lanka)
Alumni of the University of Ceylon (Peradeniya)
Alumni of Nalanda College, Colombo
Permanent Representatives of Sri Lanka to the United Nations
2009 deaths
1928 births
Deshamanya
Alumni of St. Peter's College, Colombo